The Independence Commemorative Decoration was a Rhodesian civil decoration awarded to persons who had rendered valuable service to Rhodesia. The award was instituted in 1970 by Presidential Warrant, the first awards being made the same year. Recipients were entitled to the post-nominal letters ICD.

The medal was a circular bronze medal worn on the breast. The obverse bore the shield from Rhodesia's coat of arms and the legend COMMEMORATION OF INDEPENDENCE RHODESIA, while the reverse was blank. The medal was impressed in small capitals with the recipient's name on the rim, and was awarded with a case of issue, miniature medal for wear, and an illuminated certificate. The ribbon consisted of five equal stripes, green, white, gold, white, green, identical to the Independence Decoration.

Over 150 awards of the Independence Commemorative Decoration were made between 1970 and 1978. Most recipients were political supporters or allies of the Rhodesian Front government of Ian Smith; the decoration was awarded to over 20 traditional leaders as a reward for their tacit support of the government. Recipients included the ZUPO leader Jeremiah Chirau, and the Rhodesian High Commissioner in London, Andrew Skeen.

The last recipient of the Independence Commemorative Decoration was the sanctions-buster Jack Malloch, owner of air transport company Affretair, in 1978. The Decoration fell into abeyance following Zimbabwe Rhodesia's adoption of majority rule in 1979, and the country's transformation into Zimbabwe a year later.

Selected recipients 

 Jeremiah Chirau
 Roger Hawkins
 Richard Hope Hall
 Jack Malloch
 Jack Pithey
 Andrew Skeen
 David Smith
 Rubidge Stumbles
 Archibald Wilson

References

Saffery, D., 2006. The Rhodesia Medal Roll, Jeppestown Press, United Kingdom.

External links 
Orders, Medals and Decorations of Zimbabwe
Independence Commemorative Decoration entry in World Medals Index

Orders, decorations, and medals of Rhodesia